Sodium hexachloroiridate(III) is an inorganic compound with the chemical formula Na3IrCl6.

Preparation
Sodium hexachloroiridate(III) can be produced by the reduction of sodium hexachloroiridate(IV) with Fe2+, oxalate or hydrogen sulfide.

It can also produced by heating iridium metal with NaCl and Cl2.

Reactions
Sodium hexachloroiridate(III) will get dehydrated at 110°C, and reversible decomposes at 550°C.
2 Na3IrCl6 ⇌ 2 Ir + 6 NaCl + 3 Cl2

In air, sodium hexachloroiridate(III) will be oxidized at 450°C.
2 Na3IrCl6 + 2 O2 → 2 IrO2 + 6 NaCl + 3 Cl2

It reacts with hydrochloric acid to form hydrogen hexachloroiridate(III).

It also reacts with ammonia water in sealed tube at 145°C to form [Ir(NH3)6]Cl3.

References

Iridium compounds
Sodium compounds
Chloro complexes
Chlorometallates